Hajjiabad (also Romanized as Ḩājjīābād and Hājīābād; also known as Haji Abad Mo’men Abad) is a village in Mud Rural District, Mud District, Sarbisheh County, South Khorasan Province, Iran. At the 2006 census, its population was 317, in 87 families.

References 

Populated places in Sarbisheh County